The Order of precedence in Russia is listed below. The President of Russia, currently Vladimir Putin, is the highest-ranking office in Russia, followed by the Prime Minister of Russia, held by Mikhail Mishustin.

 President of Russia (Vladimir Putin)
 President-elect of Russia
 Chairman of the Government of the Russian Federation (Prime-Minister)  (Mikhail Mishustin)
 Chairman of the Federation Council (Valentina Matviyenko)
 Chairman of the State Duma (Vyacheslav Volodin)
 Former Presidents of Russia (the only living former President is Dmitry Medvedev)
 Chairman of the Constitutional Court of Russia (Valery Zorkin)
 Chairman of the Supreme Court of Russia (Vyacheslav Lebedev)
 Prosecutor General of Russian Federation (Igor Krasnov)
 Patriarch of Moscow and all Rus' (Kirill)
 Chief of Staff of Presidential Administration of Russian Federation (Anton Vaino)
 Secretary of Security Council of Russia (Nikolai Patrushev)
 First Deputy Prime Minister of Russia, First Deputy of Head of Presidential Administration of Russian Federation
 Deputy Prime Ministers of Head of Russia, Deputies of Head of Presidential Administration of Russian Federation
 Former Prime Ministers of Russia
 First Deputy of Head of Federation Council of Russian Federation, First Deputy of Head of State Duma of Russian Federation
 Deputies of Head of Federation Council of Russian Federation, Deputies of Head of State Duma of Russian Federation
 Assistants to the President of Russian Federation
 Heads of Departments of President of Russian Federation
 Head of Protocol of President of Russian Federation
 Press-secretary of President of Russian Federation
 Federal Ministers (Note: Minister of Foreign Affairs of Russian Federation on events of foreign contacts positions after Chief of Staff Presidential Administration of Russian Federation)
 Head of Central Election Commission of the Russian Federation
 Head of Accounts Chamber of Russian Federation
 Head of Central Bank of Russian Federation
 President of Russian Academy of Sciences
 Plenipotentiary Representatives of the President of the Russian Federation in a Federal Districts
 Heads of Federal Services and Federal Agencies subordinated directly to President of Russian Federation
 Head of Investigative Committee of Russian Federation
 Parliamentary leaders in State Duma of Russian Federation, Heads of Committees and Commissions of Federal Assemblée of Russian Federation 
 Heads of subjects of Russian Federation
 Councilors of President of Russian Federation
 Heads of Federal Services and Federal Agencies subordinated to Head of Government of Russian Federation
 Heads of Federal Services and Federal Agencies subordinated to Federal Ministries
 Commissioner for Human Rights in Russian Federation, Commissioner for Children's Rights in Russian Federation
 Ambassadors Extraordinary and Plenipotentiary of Russian Federation in foreign countries, Permanent Envoys in international organizations (Note: Ambassadors Extraordinary and Plenipotentiary of Russian Federation in foreign countries and Permanent Envoys in international organizations on events of foreign contacts positions after Assistants to the President of Russian Federation)
 Members of Federation Council of Russian Federation, Members of State Duma of Russian Federation
 Permanent members of Holy Synod of the Russian Orthodox Church, Heads of other religious confessions - members of Council for Cooperation with Religious Organizations under President of Russian Federation
 Deputy of Head of Constitutional Court of Russian Federation, Judge-Secretary of Constitutional Court of Russian Federation, recipients of Order of St. Andrew the Apostle the First-Called, recipients of Order of St. George, Heroes or the Russian Federation, recipients of Order "For Merit to the Fatherland" of I and II classes, if not already listed above in this order of precedence
 First deputy of Head of Supreme Court of Russian Federation, First deputy of Head of Supreme Court of Arbitration of Russian Federation, First deputy of Prosecutor General of Russian Federation, First deputies of Head of Central Bank of Russian Federation
 Deputies of Head of Supreme Court of Russian Federation, Deputies of Head of Supreme Court of Arbitration of Russian Federation, Deputies of Prosecutor General of Russian Federation, Deputies of Head of Central Bank of Russian Federation, Deputy of Head of Accounts Chamber of Russian Federation
 Judges of Constitutional Court of Russian Federation, Judges of Supreme Court of Russian Federation, Judges of Supreme Court of Arbitration of Russian Federation
 People who holding high offices of Federal State Services, Heads of the consultative and advisory bodies under President of Russian Federation
 Heads of legislative bodies of government of subjects of Russian Federation
 Auditors of Accounts Chamber of Russian Federation
 Recipients of Order "For Merit to the Fatherland" of III and IV classes, if not already listed above in this order of precedence

Order of precedence of the Russian Federation is determined in accordance with the decrees of the President of the Russian Federation dated November 12, 2008 No. 1600 and dated August 06, 2011 No. 1056 

Russia
Government of Russia